The Hare with Amber Eyes: A Hidden Inheritance (2010) is a family memoir by British ceramicist Edmund de Waal. De Waal tells the story of his family, the Ephrussi, once a very wealthy European Jewish banking dynasty, centred in Odessa, Vienna and Paris, and peers of the Rothschild family. The Ephrussis lost almost everything in 1938 when the Nazis confiscated their property, and were unable to recover most of their property after the war, including priceless artwork; an easily hidden collection of 264 Japanese netsuke miniature sculptures was saved, tucked away inside a mattress by Anna, a loyal maid at Palais Ephrussi in Vienna during the war years. The collection has been passed down through five generations of the Ephrussi family, providing a common thread for the story of its fortunes from 1871 to 2009. In 2021, The Hare with Amber Eyes was distributed in Vienna as a free book, with a print run of 100,000 copies.

Content 
The narrator describes the lengthy research into various – long deceased – family members and concentrates his report on the touching story of a collection of 264 netsuke, Japanese miniatures, carved from wood or ivory. This collection was acquired by Charles Ephrussi in Paris, came as a gift to Charles's cousin, Viktor Ephrussi, and was hidden by a nanny named Anna when organs of the Nazi state confiscated the Palais Ephrussi and the family's art collection there and returned to the family after 1945. The book is equipped with a family tree.

Response 
The book is described by the literary scholar Oliver vom Hove as an “unprecedentedly precise memory book”. However, it has been argued that the reported history of the Ephrussi & Co. banking house does not correspond to historical facts. For example, Alexander Weiner, the head of the bank from 1924, does not appear in the entire book. And there are other inaccuracies: The depiction of Ignaz von Ephrussi contradicts the documents that have been preserved in the inheritance file, which is in the Vienna City and State Archives. The social and economic historian Roman Sandgruber comments on the wealth of Victor Ephrussis, who is characterized as the richest banker in Vienna after Albert Rothschild: "De Waal also overestimates him. He was by no means the second richest banker in the city, but in 1910 ranked 258th on the income scale." Contemporary historian Oliver Rathkolb has dedicated his own search for traces to Anna, but without success.

Literature  
 Oliver vom Hofe, Unersetzliche Kulturgeschichte. Vor zehn Jahren erschienen – und bald als Gratisbuch in Wien verteilt: „Der Hase mit den Bernsteinaugen“ von Edmund de Waal. Eine Wiederlektüre, in: Wiener Zeitung, 30./31. Oktober 2021, S. 31-32.
 Peter Melichar, Wer war Alexander Weiner? In Edmund de Waals Erinnerungsbuch über die Familie Ephrussi fehlt einer für die Geschichte bedeutende Person. Eine Ergänzung, in: Wiener Zeitung, 30./31. Oktober 2021, S. 33.
 Gabriele Kohlbauer-Fritz/Agnes Meisinger/Tom Juncker (Hg.), Die Ephrussis. Eine Zeitreise/The Ephrussis, Wien 2019.
 Peter Melichar, Neuordnung im Bankwesen. Die NS-Maßnahmen und die Problematik der Restitution, Veröffentlichungen der Österreichischen Historikerkommission 11, Wien und München 2004.
 Peter Melichar, Bankiers in der Krise: Der österreichische Privatbankensektor 1928-1938. In: Geld und Kapital, Bd. 7 (= Jahrbuch der Gesellschaft für mitteleuropäische Banken- und Sparkassengeschichte. Privatbankiers in Mitteleuropa zwischen den Weltkriegen 2003), Stuttgart 2005, S. 135-191.

Awards and honours
2011 Ondaatje Prize, winner.
2011 JQ Wingate Prize, shortlist.
2011 ALA Notable Book.
2010 Costa Book Awards, winner (Biography).
2010 Galaxy National Book Award, New Writer of the Year
2010 Amazon.com, Best of the Month, September
2010 The Economist, Books of the Year list

Editions
First UK edition: The Hare with Amber Eyes: A Hidden Inheritance, Chatto & Windus, Great Britain, 2010.
First US edition: The Hare with Amber Eyes: A Family's Century of Art and Loss, Farrar, Straus and Giroux, New York, 2010. 
German translation by Brigitte Hilzensauer: Der Hase mit den Bernsteinaugen. Das verborgene Erbe der Familie Ephrussi, Paul Zsolnay Verlag, Vienna, 2011,

References

External links

The Hare with Amber Eyes, author website.
Edmund de Waal on YouTube, by Random Reads, June 29, 2010.
"Edmund de Waal on Proust: The writer behind the hare" - article about the book, of April 1, 2011

2010 non-fiction books
Ephrussi family
History of Paris
Impressionism
History of Vienna
1940s in Japan
1950s in Japan
1990s in Japan
Netsuke
History of Odesa
History books about Jews and Judaism
Chatto & Windus books